Kid British, often styled as KiD BRiTiSH, were an English 6-piece music group, hailing from Manchester, United Kingdom. The band was composed of Adio Marchant (vocals), Simeon McLean (vocals), Sean Mbaya (vocals/guitar/keyboard), Dominick Allen (vocals/rhythm guitar), Mykey Wilson (drums) and  Tom Peek (bass guitar).

Former members were James Mayer (vocals), Tom Peek (bass) who both left due to personal reasons. Adio Marchant has since developed his own indie pop side project called Bipolar Sunshine. His debut EP, Aesthetics, was released on 18 June 2013, and the single Rivers was iTunes free single of the week, in the week commencing 14 July 2013.

History

Kid British came into existence when Sean Mbaya from Prestwich (who worked as a producer under the name Kid British) worked with a band called Action Manky - made up of schoolmates Adio Marchant from Chorlton and Simeon McLean and James Mayer from Withington - all joined forces in 2007 to form the band, initially known as Kid British & the Action Manky, but soon shortened to simply Kid British. The band signed to Mercury Records in May 2008, signed a long-term publishing deal with EMI Music Publishing in June, and released their first single "Elizabeth" (7" vinyl only) on the 'Another Music Another Kitchen' label in the October of that same year. Their first Mercury release followed in the form of the Leave London (10" vinyl & digital download) EP featuring the tracks "She Will Leave", "Lost in London" and "Elizabeth", which was promoted by ten "guerilla gigs" in one day at various London tube stations, which led to the band playing an impromptu version of one of the tracks from the EP in front of Mayor Boris Johnson when they found themselves in the same train carriage. The four core members were joined in the band by musicians Tom Peek (bass guitar), Dominick Allen (rhythm guitar), and Mikey Wilson (drums).

The band received regular airplay from BBC Radio One's Chris Moyles and also played support slots with The Enemy (2007), The Specials (2009) & UB40 (2010).

The band released the single "Our House Is Dadless", which samples the Madness track "Our House" on 7 July 2009, peaking at number 63 in the UK Singles Chart in its first week of release. The band's It Was This Or Football First Half EP reached number 67 in the UK in its first week of release, dropping out of the top 75 entirely the following week. The mooted Second Half, originally advertised within the liner notes of the 'First Half' as being due for release in September 2009, remains unreleased, and the full twelve-track album that combined the two was not commercially released, although promotional copies were issued. In February 2010, the band announced that they were recording new tracks for the album and that it was now planned to be released in Summer 2010.

The band released the single "Winner" on 28 June, less than 12 hours after the England football team's 4–1 defeat to Germany at the 2010 FIFA World Cup in South Africa, which resulted in their elimination from the first round of the bracket phase. It was their first release since being dropped by Mercury Records. It failed to reach the top 100 of the singles chart, but was featured in Electronic Arts' tie-in World Cup video game.

In 2011 they released an EP called "Northern Stories" as a free download, they also did the 'Northern Stories' tour around Manchester, Stoke-upon-Trent, Birmingham, London, Wakefield, Leicester, Carlisle & Oswestry.

During the early part of their career they worked with famed sound engineer and producer John Pennington, who has worked for many bands since leaving Strawberry studios including Moby. During the last three years of their career they took on Pete Poweron Smith as their sound engineer, Pete has written and produced as Big Arm, done sound with A Certain Ratio and now does sound for Lewis Watson, Bipolar Sunshine and Mayer.

Back with a new line-up, on 24 June 2012 released an EP called You Can't Please Them All on LAB Records with a headline tour due to follow later. On 27 March 2012, it was confirmed that Kid British would support The Stone Roses at their Heaton Park concert in Manchester on 29 June 2012. It was confirmed on 29 June 2012 that Kid British will be doing an intimate UK tour called 'You Can't Please Them All' with six dates taking place. Glasgow, York, London, Southampton, Birmingham and the last date being at their hometown of Manchester.

A statement was released along with their final ever Kid British video for the new single "You Against The World" on 17 September 2012 that they were going their separate ways. Having to cancel three of their dates on the You Can't Please Them All tour in Glasgow, York and Southampton due to personal reasons.

Kid British played their final gig in Manchester in December 2012.

Musical style
With their witty social commentary and lively performances, Kid British were often compared to the likes of The Specials, Madness, Blur and The Streets.

The band combine indie rock, ska and hip hop. Arwa Haider of Metro described their sound as "a very modern mishmash of styles – indie rock, r'n'b, rap, ska revival – and bring a cuddly blokeishness to their jaunty tunes".

Discography

Album
It Was This or Football (2009), Mercury

EPs
Leave London (2009), Mercury
iTunes Live: London Festival '09 (2009), Mercury
It Was This or Football - First Half (2009), Mercury
Northern Stories (2011) (self-produced)
You Can't Please Them All (2012), LAB

Singles
"Elizabeth" (2008), Mercury
"Sunny Days" (2009), Mercury
"Our House Is Dadless" (2009), Mercury
"Winner" (2010), Modern English
"Until Monday" (2012), LAB
"You Against the World" (2012), LAB

References

External links

 

Musical groups from Manchester
English ska musical groups
English hip hop groups
Musical groups established in 2007
Musical groups disestablished in 2012